Gekko browni, also  known commonly as Brown's gecko, Brown's fringe gecko, and Brown's wolf gecko, is a species of lizard in the family Gekkonidae. The species is endemic to West Malaysia.

Etymology
The specific name, browni, is in honor of American herpetologist Walter Creighton Brown.

Habitat
The preferred natural habitat of G. browni is forest.

Behavior

Reproduction
G. browni is oviparous.

References

Further reading
Russell AP (1979). A New Species of Luperosaurus (Gekkonidae) with Comments on the Genus". Herpetologica 35 (3): 282–288. (Luperosaurus browni, new species). 

Gekko
Reptiles described in 1979
Endemic fauna of Malaysia
Reptiles of Malaysia